Boshnu or Beshnow may refer to:
 Beshnow, Hormozgan
 Boshnu, Razavi Khorasan